Olivier Shyaka (born 14 August 1995) is a Rwandan basketball player who plays for REG BBC club of the NBL Rwanda. He also plays for the Rwanda national basketball team.

Club career
Since 2018, Shyaka plays for REG BBC. In the 2020–21 season, Shyaka won his first national championship with REG. He was named MVP of the league after scoring 30 points in Game 1 of the finals, and scoring 22 points in Game 2.

National team career
Shyaka represented Rwanda's national basketball team on many occasions. At AfroBasket 2013, Shyaka was one of Rwanda's main players. He also played at AfroBasket 2017 and AfroBasket 2021.

BAL career statistics

|-
|-
|style="text-align:left;"|2022
|style="text-align:left;"|REG
| 5 || 0 || 12.3 || .450 || .462 || – || 2.0 || 0.4 || 0.0 || 0.0 || 4.8

References

External links
 2015 AfroBasket Profile
 Real GM Profile
 Basketball. Zone 5 Basketball Club Championship at the KPA Gymnasium. Mombasa

1995 births
Living people
Rwandan men's basketball players
Shooting guards
Small forwards
Espoir BBC players
REG BBC players
People from Kigali